Sofie Blichert-Toft (born 31 March 1994) is a Danish handball player who currently plays for Skanderborg Håndbold.

References

1994 births
Living people
People from Skive Municipality
Danish female handball players
Sportspeople from the Central Denmark Region